The 1893 San Jose State Spartans football team represented State Teachers College at San Jose during the 1893 college football season.  In their second year of play, the Spartans lost in their contest against San Jose YMCA.

Schedule

References

San Jose State
San Jose State Spartans football seasons
College football winless seasons
San Jose State Spartans football